The Latin Grammy Award for Best MPB Album is an honor presented annually at the Latin Grammy Awards, a ceremony that recognizes excellence and creates a wider awareness of cultural diversity and contributions of Latin recording artists in the United States and internationally. According to the category description guide for the 13th Latin Grammy Awards, the award is for vocal or instrumental Musica Popular Brasileira albums containing at least 51% playing time of newly recorded material, and is awarded to solo artists, duos or groups.

The albums, Livro by Caetano Veloso (2000), Maria Rita by Maria Rita (2004), Regência: Vince Mendoza by Ivan Lins and The Metropole Orchestra (2009) and Especial Ivete, Gil E Caetano by Caetano Veloso, Gilberto Gil and Ivete Sangalo (2012) were nominated for Album of the Year, but didn't win.

The album Livro by Caetano Veloso won this award in 2000 and the Grammy Award for Best World Music Album in the same year.

Cantando Histórias  by Ivan Lins became the first Brazilian album and only Portuguese language album to win this award and Album of the Year in 2005. The same year, Eletracústico by Gilberto Gil lost this award to Ivan Lins' album, but won the Grammy Award for Best Contemporary World Music Album in 2006. With her win in 2022, Liniker became the first trans artist to win a Latin Grammy Award.

Winners and nominees

2000s

2010s

2020s

References

External links
Official site of the Latin Grammy Awards

 
MPB Album